Khalaf Ali may refer to:
 Khalaf Ali, Ardabil
 Khalaf Ali, East Azerbaijan
 Khalaf Ali, Zanjan